Staudinger is a German surname. Notable people with the surname include:

Alma Staudinger (1921–2017), Austrian diver
Christian W. Staudinger (born 1952), German artist
Christina Staudinger (born 1987), Austrian freestyle skier
Conny Staudinger (born 1927), Austrian ice hockey player
Hannes Staudinger (1907–1974), Austrian cinematographer
Hans Staudinger (1889–1980), German politician
Hermann Staudinger (1881–1965), German chemist who demonstrated the existence of macromolecules and was the winner of the 1953 Nobel Prize in Chemistry
Josef Staudinger (1906–1998), Austrian diver who competed in the 1928 and 1932 Summer Olympics
Magda Staudinger (1902–1997), Latvian biologist and botanist
Magdalene Epply-Staudinger (1907–2005), Austrian diver
Otto Staudinger (1830–1900), German entomologist
Rupert Staudinger (born 1997), British-German luger
Stella Staudinger (born 1972), Austrian basketball player
Ursula Staudinger (born 1959), German psychologist
Wolfgang Staudinger (born 1963), West German luger who competed from 1978 to 1989

See also
Staudinger synthesis, method to prepare β-lactams
Staudinger reaction, chemical reaction in which the combination of an azide with a phosphine or phosphite produces an iminophosphorane intermediate
Staudinger–Grumke House–Store, a historic home located in Augusta, Missouri

German-language surnames
German toponymic surnames